Patricia Selina Birley (née Burnham)  (born 27 June 1948) is an archaeologist and was the director of the Vindolanda Trust from 2002 to 2015.

Biography
Birley joined the Vindolanda Trust in the 1970s as a curator and conservator. She became its Deputy Director in 1980 and Director from 2002 to 2015.

Birley was elected as a Fellow of the Society of Antiquaries of London on 5 May 2012. Since 2010 she has served as a Deputy Lieutenant for Northumberland. She was awarded an MBE in the 2011 New Year Honours for "services to Roman Heritage in Northumberland".

Family
Patricia was married to Robin Birley and is the mother of Andrew Birley.

References

British archaeologists
1948 births
Living people
British people of English descent
English curators
Directors of museums in the United Kingdom
Members of the Order of the British Empire
Women museum directors
Deputy Lieutenants of Northumberland
Fellows of the Society of Antiquaries of London
British women archaeologists
Patricia Birley
Women classical scholars